Chinese History: A New Manual, written by Endymion Wilkinson, is an encyclopedic guide to Sinology and Chinese history. The New Manual lists and describes published, excavated, artifactual, and archival sources from pre-history to the twenty-first century, as well as selected up-to-date scholarship in Chinese, Japanese, and Western languages. Detailed annotations evaluate reference and research tools and outline the 25 ancillary disciplines required for the study of Chinese history. Introductions to each of the chapters and interspersed short essays give encyclopedic and often witty summaries of major topics for specialists and general readers, as well as directives on the uses of history and avoidance of error in thought and analysis. 

Since its first appearance in a preliminary version in 1973, Wilkinson's manual has been continuously in print (selling on average 700 copies a year). During this time it has grown from 70,000 to over 1.7-million words. The sixth edition, issued in two volumes, has been enlarged to cover digital tools and the time period extended from prehistory to the end of the Maoist era (1978). Volume 1 covers topics and scholarship, Volume 2 presents primary and secondary sources arranged by period.

The New Manual received the Prix Stanislas Julien for 2014 in recognition of outstanding scholarship on Asian culture.

Background 

In an interview with Carla Nappi, an historian of China at the University of British Columbia, Wilkinson discussed his experience in the field and the book's background. He became interested in China as an undergraduate at Cambridge University in the early 1960s, then spent two years teaching English in Beijing up to the outbreak of the Cultural Revolution. He earned a PhD from Princeton University with a dissertation on late Qing dynasty markets and prices, but when he began teaching he still felt unprepared. He did not know, he recalled,  what to tell his graduate students about the Zhou or Shang dynasties, about which he felt his knowledge would hardly "fill an eye bath." On a research fellowship at Harvard University, Wilkinson mentioned to John Fairbank, a senior Harvard scholar, that he was gathering notes on Chinese history. Fairbank offered to publish them, and the 1973 Research Guide appeared in due course.

Wilkinson served in Beijing as the European Union Ambassador to China from 1994 to 2001, and in his spare moments turned the 1973 Research Guide into the first and second editions of the manual. After he retired from the EU in 2001, Harvard invited him to teach Chinese history, including a graduate seminar on sinological methods. From then on he worked on the New Manual, commuting between Harvard and Peking University (where he was a visiting professor).

The preliminary version of the manual (1973) was published by Harvard's East Asia Research Center. From 1998 until 2015 all editions were published by the Harvard University Asia Center for the Harvard-Yenching Institute and distributed by Harvard University Press. The fourth edition was also published in Chinese and sold a total of 13,000 copies. In 2017, Wilkinson decided as an experiment in lowering the sales price of the fifth edition to publish it himself and distribute it exclusively on Amazon. The fifth edition was also published digitally (on the Pleco platform, in November 2017). The sixth edition is once again published by Harvard University's Asia Center and distributed by the Harvard University Press. It is also available on the Pleco platform and will shortly be offered by Harvard as an enlarged database.

The Sixth (50th Anniversary) Edition (2022) 

The author explains in the Preface the principal aims of the sixth edition as being to introduce:

1. The different types of transmitted, excavated, archival, artifactual, and ecofactual primary sources from prehistory to 1949 (and in some cases to the present). Accordingly, it examines the context in which these sources were produced, preserved, and received, as well as the problems of research and interpretation associated with them;

2. The ancillary disciplines required for the study of Chinese history from prehistory to 1949 (and in many cases up to the present), including archeology, astronomy, bibliography, chronology and calendrics, codicology, diplomatics, epigraphy, genealogy, historical geography, historical linguistics, numismatics, onomastics, paleography, prosopography, sigillography, statistics, textual criticism, topography, transcription, translation strategies, and special branches of study such as the oracle bone script, bamboo and silk books, Dunhuang, Qingshuijiang, and Huizhou documents or the Ming-Qing archives;

3. The key secondary sources on questions of current focus and controversy in Chinese historical studies;

4. The latest electronic resources to disseminate, sort, and analyze Chinese historical data.

In addition to the four principal aims, the sixth edition also has five subsidiary objectives (5–9):

5. To highlight long-term changes over the course of Chinese history and by doing so provide an antidote to nationalistic, teleological history (the default mode of Chinese historiography for the last 120 years).

6. To throw new light on subjects that the secondary sources don’t touch on by asking unexpected questions. For example, why did Chinese poets write so often of lonely, silent nights? Answer: because their aim was to evoke an idea or an emotion, not to record the reality of the Chinese night which was a cacophony of animal, insect and human sounds. This leads to the history of Chinese soundscapes both rural and urban. 

7. To supply readers who are familiar with one period a springboard into others with which they are less familiar.

8. To profile the strengths and weaknesses of Chinese historiographical traditions because (i) of the central role that the writing of history played (and continues to play) in Chinese politics and culture and (ii) to a greater extent than is commonly realized, historians rely on works produced in the old historiographical traditions, even though they may ask different questions and use different conceptual frameworks.

9. To provide English translations of key Chinese terms both in the main text and in the green-shaded, terminological boxes and tables.

New Content & Layout in the Sixth Edition
In the course of updating old sections and inserting new ones over 2,000 databases, monographs, and scholarly articles have been added to the sixth edition and the coverage extended to the first 30 years of the PRC (1949-1978). The number of tables and in-text boxes has been increased to 468 (there were 277 in the fifth edition). Boxes are shaded in yellow and tables in blue. Terminological boxes and tables are both shaded in green. 
The sixth edition of the Manual is not only updated but has an entirely new look. All previous editions were published in one volume. But as the content expanded over the years from 70 thousand to 1.7 million words it became more and more difficult to squeeze everything in. One solution was to increase the size of the book and to use a smaller typeface set in two columns instead of one. But by 2021, it became clear that a more radical change was needed. Given that the Manual has been continuously updated and in print for 50 years, it seemed a good occasion to make a complete change and publish the new edition in two volumes instead of one, thus enabling the use of a larger typeface. As a result, it now reads more like a book and less like a telephone directory. 

The author has been selective in choosing resources to include in the sixth edition. As a result, no more than 14,000 primary and secondary sources are cited (compare the fifth edition [2017] which referenced 12,000 resources; the fourth edition [2015] with 9,800; the third edition [2012] with 8,800; the second edition [2000] with 4,000; and the first edition [1998] with 2,900. Very roughly, the breakdown of the 14,000 resources in the sixth edition is one quarter primary sources (almost all Chinese); one half secondary sources (mainly monographs in Chinese and English, about equally divided between the two, and over 1,500 works in Japanese and other languages); and one quarter databases (about 300) and articles or book chapters from scholarly journals or monographs (about 3,000). Most are in English, but there are also some in Chinese, Japanese, and other languages. A few hundred book reviews that make a substantial contribution are noted.

Framework
Even while updating the content and layout of the sixth edition of the Manual, Wilkinson retained the same basic framework as the third and later editions in order to facilitate navigation for readers familiar with these earlier editions. As before, the sixth edition of the Manual is divided into 14 book-length parts containing a total of 76 chapters. However, in many of the chapters the author has added new sections to include new insights and data and has also rewritten and reorganized previous chapters and sections to achieve a more logical presentation.
Books I–VIII present the sources by subject: (I) The Chinese Language; (II) Family & Kin; (III) Geography; (IV) Governing; (V) Ideas, Beliefs, and the Arts; (VI) Agriculture & Food; (VII) Technology & Science; and (VIII) Trade.
Books IX–XIV: Chs. 45 and 68 are on historiography, both traditional and modern, with a section on historical reference works for all or most of Chinese history. 
Books X to XII present the sources chronologically starting with prehistory and on through all the major dynasties. As far as possible, these period-specific chapters are arranged under five headings: (1) main historical sources; (2) other textual sources; (3) archeology; (4) foreign relations/foreign sources, and (5) research tools. The arrangement of (2) “other textual sources” follows the subject order of Books I–VIII (starting with language, biography, geography, etc., and ending with wars and uprisings). The headings may vary slightly, depending on the nature of the particular sources and topics in each period. Book XIII is on the 20th century, and its arrangement follows a different logic.

Digital Tools & Bibliography
Digital tools are cited throughout the sixth edition of the Manual and some of the main ones grouped at §45.5. Print reference works such as general histories, guides, readers, and historical encyclopedias are also introduced at §45.1–§45.4. For keeping up to date with new scholarship, see Ch. 76. Those not familiar with the terminology and conventions of Chinese manuscripts, printing, and book culture should turn to Book XIV (on the history of the Chinese book and Chinese historical bibliography).

Reception
Sixth edition: “Although originally intended for use by graduate students, it’s an essential reference for even the most casual sinologist, with its pithy explanations of key historical and cultural issues, and extensive bibliographies for those who want to delve deeper.” Peter Neville-Hadley. “The man who can answer any question on China you might have, and why ‘Have you looked in Wilkinson?’ will remain the common response to a Chinese historical query.” South China Morning Post, July 3, 2022.

Fifth edition: "The Fifth Edition of Wilkinson’s Manual is the indispensable guide for Sinologists of all stripes. A monumental achievement!" Victor H. Mair (Professor of Chinese Language and Literature, University of Pennsylvania) quoted on the back cover of the Fifth edition (2018).

"A magnificent achievement; the most valuable English-language reference book on China anywhere." Richard H. Smith (Professor Emeritus of History, Rice University) quoted on the back cover of the Fifth edition (2018)

Fourth edition: "For any student of China (and at every level), Chinese History: A New Manual is not only a masterful scholarly endeavor, it is also (happily) a real page turner indeed, with captivating insights on every page."

Third edition: Professor Nappi judged the New Manual (2012), “in every way, absolutely indispensable to work in Chinese history” and journalist and China scholar, Jonathan Mirsky reviewing it in the New York Review of Books judged it to be "A mighty book...magnificent."

Notes

References

Citations

Sources 

  Also at China File December 10, 2013 link
 Davis, Chris, (2013) History manual takes scholarship to new level China Daily.com December 13, 2013.
 
  2 vols. The sixth edition is also available as an e-book on the Pleco platform.
  The fifth edition is also available as an e-book on the Pleco platform.
  3 vols.
  
  2nd printing (revised), March 2013; 3rd printing (revised), September 2013.
 
  
  Reprinted with corrections, 1974; reprinted 1975, 1990, 1992.

External links 
 Amazon.com
 Amazon (China)
 Wenhui Xueren 文汇学人

Sinology
Bibliographies of history
History books about China
2018 non-fiction books
Published bibliographies
Harvard University Press books